Bertrand de Montaudoüin (29 March 1924 – 26 March 2004) was a French modern pentathlete. He competed at the 1952 Summer Olympics.

References

1924 births
2004 deaths
French male modern pentathletes
Olympic modern pentathletes of France
Modern pentathletes at the 1952 Summer Olympics
French generals
École Spéciale Militaire de Saint-Cyr alumni